The African Court of Justice and Human Rights (ACJHR) is an international  and regional court in Africa.
It was founded in 2004  by a merger  of the African Court on Human and Peoples' Rights and the Court of Justice of the African Union. It is the primary judicial agency of the African Union.

The court is based in the city of Arusha, Tanzania, as is the International Criminal Tribunal for Rwanda and as was its predecessor the Court of Justice of the African Union.

The court has two chambers, one for general legal matters and one for rulings on the human rights treaties.
Within this the court has both an advisory opinion role and adjudicative role. The court is competent to interpret its own judgments in an appellate chamber.

History 
The African Court of Justice and Human Rights is an international court based in Arusha, Tanzania. A merging of the African Court on Human and People's Rights and the Court of Justice of the African Union was proposed by the chairperson of the Assembly of the African Union and the head of the Federal Republic of Nigeria, President Olusegun Obasanjo, in 2004. This idea of uniting the two courts was raised because of the African Union's insufficient funds. In January 2005, a panel of legal experts assembled in Addis Ababa, Ethiopia to formulate a draft protocol that honored the integrity of the two independent courts, yet established a way to regulate the decorum of the now merged court. Afterwards, a panel met in Nigeria to propose a draft protocol to the Executive Council of the African Union. In March 2005, the draft was approved and was passed to legal experts for their recommendations. The recommendations were presented at the African Union Summit in Sirte, Libya. It was decided that operations should begin, and the headquarters would be in the East region of Africa by the Assembly of Heads of State and Government.

Functions of the New Court 
The African Court of Justice and Human Rights ultimately reviews cases of war crimes, trafficking people and/or drugs, genocide, crimes against humanity, terrorism, and piracy. The Court is essentially divided into two different sections: the Human Rights section and the General affairs section. The judges are split up evenly between the two. If there is a case pending from the previous African Court of Human and People's Rights, they will proceed to the Human Rights section of the court and the justice cases from Court of Justice of the African Union will go to the General Affairs section. Because the uniting of the African Court on Human and People's Rights and the Court of Justice of the African Union occurred in the middle of the quinquennial election times,  previous judges of the two courts were sworn into office until new officers could be elected and sworn in. The court consists of sixteen judges, all of which are from different Member States. Even though the judges of the African Court of Justice and Human Rights are expected to uphold high morality, they are granted full immunity from international laws, throughout and after office.

References

Organs of the African Union
International courts and tribunals
International supreme courts